Wilder W. Hartley (April 4, 1901 – August 17, 1970) was a member of the Los Angeles City Council from the Harbor and South Los Angeles districts from 1939 to 1943.

Biography

Hartley was born in Reno, Nevada, on April 4, 1901, and was brought to Wilmington, California, in 1903, where his father became chief engineer for the Hammond Lumber Company. Wilder attended Wilmington High School and Stanford University. He worked for Hammond for a time and then went into the insurance business. In 1924 he and Laura Mae Clark were married. Hartley was a Republican.

Hartley died at the age of 69 on August 17, 1970, in Harbor City, leaving his wife and three daughters, Marilyn Swanson, Ann Wilmoth and Joyce Christiansen. He was buried in  San Pedro.

City Council

Elections

Hartley ran against Franklin Pierce Buyer, the incumbent member for Los Angeles City Council District 15, in 1939 and was elected in the final vote. Buyer challenged Hartley again in 1941 but was defeated in the final. Two years later, in 1943, Hartley was ousted by George H. Moore in the primary, and the same Hartley-Moore matchup had the same result in 1945. Hartley tried against Moore for the last time in 1947 but was defeated in the final vote.

Positions

Hitchhikers (1940). Hartley proposed a law against hitchhiking. The Los Angeles Times reported:

Efforts of women drivers to escape the importunities of hitchhikers causes them to drive through traffic signals, creating a traffic hazard, Hartley asserted. Councilman Arthur E. Briggs declared such drivers would go through signals anyhow. He said he couldn't see why drivers did not have sufficient will power not to pick up hikers if they did not want to.

Ex-Communist (1940). Hartley joined the 9-4 majority of the council in asking Mayor Fletcher Bowron to remove a former Communist, labor leader Don Healy, from a city charter revision committee that Bowron had appointed months previously. "Communists don't change overnight," Hartley said, referring to Healy's switch in registration from Communist to  Democratic.

Mayor (1940). He was appointed to a committee of five council members to call on Bowron to complain about "persistent and erroneous" remarks the mayor made about the council in his radio addresses.

Servicemen (1943). He suggested that "spacious City Hall rooms" might be set aside at night for emergency sleeping quarters for servicemen "instead of having them walking the streets, sleeping in parks or telephone booths due to lack of hotel rooms."

References

Access to the Los Angeles Times links requires the use of a library card.

1901 births
1970 deaths
Politicians from Reno, Nevada
Los Angeles City Council members
California Republicans
20th-century American politicians
People from Wilmington, Los Angeles